The International Association for the Study of Popular Music (abbreviated IASPM) is an international learned society dedicated to the scholarly study of popular music. It was established in September 1981, with Charles Hamm and Simon Frith as two of its founding members. By 1988, it had members in over 30 countries. Since 2002, its official headquarters has been at the University of Liverpool's Institute of Popular Music, which is also the repository for the Association's archived materials. The Journal of Popular Music Studies, published by the University of California Press, is the official journal of the Association's United States branch (abbreviated IASPM-US). It also published the IASPM Journal.

References

External links 
 

Musicology
Study of Popular Music
Organizations established in 1981
International music organizations